George Edward Bradley (October 21, 1906 – September 24, 1993) was an American optometrist and politician who served on the Massachusetts Governor's Council, in the Massachusetts House of Representatives and as the 24th Mayor of Somerville, Massachusetts.

See also
 Massachusetts legislature: 1937–1938, 1939, 1953–1954, 1955–1956

Notes

1906 births
1993 deaths
Democratic Party members of the Massachusetts House of Representatives
Mayors of Somerville, Massachusetts
Massachusetts city council members
Fordham University alumni
20th-century American politicians
Members of the Massachusetts Governor's Council